Susan Pearce (born 6 January 1969) is a former Australian cricketer. She played two List A matches for Western Australia during the 2004–05 season of the Women's National Cricket League (WNCL).

References

External links
 
 

1969 births
Place of birth missing (living people)
Living people
Australian cricketers
Australian women cricketers
Western Australia women cricketers